The European Automobile Manufacturers Association (abbreviated ACEA) is the main lobbying and standards group of the automobile industry in the European Union. In February 1991 it became the successor of the CCMC manufacturers committee which was founded in October 1972.

Its members include: BMW, DAF, Daimler Truck, Ford of Europe, Ferrari, Honda, Hyundai Motor Europe, Iveco, Jaguar Land Rover, Mercedes-Benz Group, Renault, Stellantis, Toyota Europe, Volkswagen Group, Volvo Cars and Volvo Group.

On 13 June 2022, Stellantis has announced it would leave the European carmaker association ACEA by the end of 2022 as part of a new approach to addressing issues and challenges of future mobility, including a shift away from traditional lobbying activity.

On 8 July 2022, Volvo Cars announced it will leave the European Automobile Manufacturers Association (ACEA) by the end of 2022, citing differences between its zero-emission strategy and that of Europe's car lobby group.

One major area of ACEA work including its predecessor associations has been in performance quality classifications for 4-stroke engine oils. That history goes back to 1919 (Bureau Permanent International des Constructeurs d'Automobile – BPICA) that was renamed in 1985 (Organisation Internationale des Constructeurs d'Automobiles – OICA).  The ACEA has its predecessor in the CCMC (Comité des Constructeurs du Marché Commun) founded in October 1972 by French (Citroën, Peugeot, Renault), German (Mercedes, Volkswagen), Italian (Fiat) and British (BLMC) manufacturers.

The ACEA is studying electric vehicle charging stations and expects that Type 2 Mode 3 connectors also to be used for home charging in the second phase after 2017 while still allowing Mode 2 charging with established plug types that are already available in home environments.

The group also raises awareness of safety technology to improve road safety.

Presidents 
The presidency had been rotated among French, Italian and German automobile manufacturers.

 Carlos Tavares (PSA): 2018–2019
 Dieter Zetsche (Daimler): 2016–2017
 Carlos Ghosn (Renault): 2014–2015
 Philippe Varin (PSA): 2014 
 Sergio Marchionne (Fiat) : 2012
 Dieter Zetsche (Daimler): 2010–2011
 Carlos Ghosn (Renault) 2009
 Christian Streiff (PSA) 2008
 Sergio Marchionne (Fiat) : 2006–2007
 Bernd Pischetsrieder (Volkswagen) : 2004–2005
 Louis Schweitzer (Renault): 2003
 Jean-Martin Folz (PSA): 2002
 Paolo Cantarella (Fiat / Ferrari): 2000–2001
 Ferdinand Piech (Volkswagen): 1999
 Bernd Pischetsrieder (BMW): 1998
 Louis Schweitzer (Renault): 1997
 Jacques Calvet (PSA): 1996
 Giorgio Garuzzo (Fiat): 1994 / 1995
 Helmut Werner (Daimler): 1993
 Eberhard von Kuenheim (BMW): 1992

 foundation year 1991 (predecessor "Comité des Constructeurs du Marché Commun")

Research 
Collaborative research activities of the automotive manufacturers and other efforts are carried out under the auspices of the European Council for Automotive Research and Development (EUCAR). Together with automotive suppliers, the automotive manufacturers support 30% of all research and development in the European Union.

EUCAR was founded in 1994 and is hosted within ACEA.

See also 
 ACEA agreement
 European emission standard
 Japan Automobile Manufacturers Association (JAMA)
 Korea Automobile Manufacturers Association (KAMA)
 European Association of Motorcycle Manufacturers

References

External links
 Official ACEA site

Automotive industry in Europe
Lobbying in Europe
Motor trade associations
Motor vehicle manufacturers
Pan-European trade and professional organizations